Trapelus is a genus of Middle Eastern agamid lizards, which contains 13 species.

Species
Listed alphabetically, the species are:
Trapelus agilis  – brilliant ground agama
Trapelus agnetae 
Trapelus boehmei 
Trapelus flavimaculatus  – yellow-spotted agama
Trapelus megalonyx  – Afghan ground agama
Trapelus mutabilis  – Egyptian agama, desert agama
Trapelus persicus  – Olivier's agama, Baluch ground agama
Trapelus rubrigularis  – red-throated agama
Trapelus ruderatus  – Olivier's agama, Baluch ground agama
Trapelus sanguinolentus  – steppe agama
Trapelus savignii  – Savigny's agama
Trapelus schmitzi  – Schmitz's agama
Trapelus tournevillei  – Erg agama, Sahara agama

Nota bene: A binomial authority in parentheses indicates that the species was originally described in a genus other than Trapelus.

References

Further reading
Cuvier G (1817). Le règne animal distribué d'après son organisation, pour servir de base à l'histoire naturelle des animaux et d'introduction à l'anatomie comparée. Tome II, contenant les reptiles, les poissons, les mollusques et les annélides. Paris: Déterville. xviii + 532 pp. (Trapelus, new genus, p. 35). (in French).

External links

 
Lizard genera
Taxa named by Georges Cuvier